Gütersloh I is an electoral constituency (German: Wahlkreis) represented in the Bundestag. It elects one member via first-past-the-post voting. Under the current constituency numbering system, it is designated as constituency 131. It is located in eastern North Rhine-Westphalia, comprising most of the district of Gütersloh.

Gütersloh I was created for the 1980 federal election. Since 2009, it has been represented by Ralph Brinkhaus of the Christian Democratic Union (CDU).

Geography
Gütersloh I is located in eastern North Rhine-Westphalia. As of the 2021 federal election, it comprises the entirety of the Gütersloh district excluding the municipalities of Werther and Schloß Holte-Stukenbrock.

History
Gütersloh I was created in 1980, then known as Gütersloh. It acquired its current name in the 2013 election. In the 1980 through 1998 elections, it was constituency 101 in the numbering system. From 2002 through 2009, it was number 132. Since 2013, it has been number 131.

Originally, the constituency was coterminous with the Gütersloh district. In the 1998 election, it lost the municipality of Werther. In the 2005 election, it lost the municipality of Schloß Holte-Stukenbrock.

Members
The constituency has been held continuously by the Christian Democratic Union (CDU) since its creation. It was first represented by Ottfried Hennig from 1980 to 1990, followed by Hubert Doppmeier until 1994. Hubert Deittert then served from 1994 to 2009. Ralph Brinkhaus was elected in 2009, and re-elected in 2013, 2017, and 2021.

Election results

2021 election

2017 election

2013 election

2009 election

References

Federal electoral districts in North Rhine-Westphalia
1980 establishments in West Germany
Constituencies established in 1980
Gütersloh (district)